Sumeyye Manz (born Güleç on October 30, 1989, in Nürnberg) is a German taekwondo practitioner of Turkish descent.

She won the gold medal at the 2008 European Taekwondo Championships in Rome. She became bronze medalist at the 2005 World Taekwondo Championships in Madrid, Spain and 2011 World Taekwondo Championships in Gyeongju, South Korea.

She represented Germany at the 2008 Olympics and 2012 Olympics. At the 2008 Olympics she was defeated in the first round by Dalia Contreras.  At the 2012 Summer Olympics, she competed in the Women's 49kg competition, but was defeated in the first round by Yang Shu-Chun.

Sümeyye Güleç is married to Daniel Manz, also a German national taekwondo practitioner.

References

External links
sports-reference.com

German female taekwondo practitioners
1989 births
Living people
Olympic taekwondo practitioners of Germany
Taekwondo practitioners at the 2012 Summer Olympics
Taekwondo practitioners at the 2008 Summer Olympics
German people of Turkish descent
World Taekwondo Championships medalists
European Taekwondo Championships medalists
Sportspeople from Nuremberg
21st-century German women